Giorgio Locchi  (1923 – 25 October 1992) was an Italian journalist and writer. He was among the founders of GRECE.

Life
Also known by the pseudonym Hans-Jürgen Nigra, he was for a long time the Paris correspondent for the Italian newspaper Il Tempo. After graduating in law from the University of Rome, he moved to Paris in the mid-fifties. Here he came into contact with Alain de Benoist, with whom he created the ethnonationalist think-tank GRECE, also known as New Right. By this time he began to write for magazines like Éléments and Nouvelle École. He also collaborated with several magazines and newspapers including La Destra, L'Uomo Libero and Secolo d'Italia.
 
One of the leading exponents of New Right, he broke away from it because he was averse to democracy and a supporter of Conservative Revolutionary movement values.

He was the author of several books translated into French, German and Spanish. His works revolved around Roman Empire, anti-Americanism and Nietzsche's anti-Christian thought.

Among the best known of Locchi's workes is the Nietzsche, Wagner e il mito sovrumanista, which was counted among the classics of hermeneutic on Richard Wagner.

His works influenced authors such as Guillaume Faye, Pierre Vial, Pierre Krebs, Robert Steuckers and Stefano Vaj.

Works
Giorgio Locchi and Alain de Benoist, Il male americano, Roma, L.E.D.E., (1979).
 Giorgio Locchi and Robert de Herte (Alain de Benoist), Die USA, Europas missratenes Kind, München-Berlin, Herbig, cop., (1979).
Giorgio Locchi, L'essenza del fascismo, with an essay and interview by Marco Tarchi, Castelnuovo Magra, Edizioni del Tridente, (1981).
 Giorgio Locchi, Das unvergängliche Erbe, Kassel, Thule-Seminar, (1981).
Giorgio Locchi, Nietzsche, Wagner e il mito sovrumanista, preface by Paolo Isotta, Napoli, Akropolis, (1982).
 Giorgio Locchi and Robert Steuckers, Konservative Revolution: Introducción al nacionalismo radical aleman, 1918-1932, Valencia, Ediciones Acebo Dorado, (1990).
Giorgio Locchi, Definizioni, Milano, Barbarossa, (2006).
 Giorgio Locchi, Definiciones : los textos que revolucionaron la cultura inconformista Europea, Molins de Rei, Barcelona Nueva República D.L., (2010).
Giorgio Locchi, Prospettive indoeuropee, Roma, Settimo Sigillo, (2010).
 Giorgio Locchi, Podstata fašismu, Praha, Délský potápěč, (2011).
 Giorgio Locchi, Adriano Romualdi, l'essence du fascisme et la conception sphérique du temps de l'histoire; Le parti de la vie : clercs et guerriers d'Europe et d'Asia, Saint-Genis-Laval, Éditions Akribeia, (2015).
 Giorgio Locchi and Alain de Benoist, El enemigo americano : érase una vez América, Torredembarra, Tarragona Fides D.L., (2016).
 Giorgio Locchi, Figuras de la revolución conservadora, Torredembarra, Tarragona Fides D.L., (2016).

References

Sources
 Marco Fraquelli, A destra di Porto Alegre : Perché la Destra è più noglobal della Sinistra, preface by Giorgio Galli, Catanzaro, Rubbettino, 2005, p. 94.
Daniel S. Forrest, Suprahumanism : European man and the regeneration of history, London, Arktos Media, 2014.
 Francesco Germinario, Tradizione Mito Storia : La cultura politica della destra radicale e i suoi teorici, Roma, Carocci, 2014.

External links
 Gennaro Malgieri, Hommage à Giorgio Locchi (1923-1992), Synergies européennes, Vouloir, February 1993

1923 births
Journalists from Rome
New Right (Europe)
Italian political writers
Italian essayists
Italian modern pagans
Italian male journalists
20th-century Italian writers
Male essayists
1992 deaths
20th-century essayists
20th-century Italian journalists
Italian expatriates in France
20th-century Italian male writers